Radio Veritas Asia is the non-commercial Catholic shortwave station broadcasting to Asia. It is based in Quezon City, Philippines, and is owned by the Philippine Radio Educational and Information Center, which previously owned the original Radio Veritas from 1969 to 1991. Its Urdu Service started its broadcast on August 14, 1987, in Lahore, Pakistan. Its mission is to promote justice to the oppressed through programs with specific moral, religious and inspirational content, and to voice peace and harmony among the sects, races, and sexes through sociocultural programs and to promote dialogue among different religions.

History
In December 1958, the delegates of the Southeast Asian Bishops' Conference unanimously resolved to establish a radio station to serve the countries of Southeast Asia. Eleven years after that, Radio Veritas was inaugurated, on April 11, 1969.

The Federation of Asian Bishops' Conference (FABC) was entrusted with the operations of RVA from its beginning in 1970. This was confirmed by FABC's governing body, the General Assembly, in 1974.

Since 1991 the annual magazine of the Radio Veritas Asia Urdu Service has been housed in the office building of the WAVE Studio. Most programs for Radio Veritas Asia's Urdu service are also recorded at the WAVE studio.

Radio Veritas embarked on different means of delivering its religious message. It started using new technology such as the Internet and webcasting, and plans to upgrade to digital broadcasting.

Between 2007 and June 2011 it had received over 30,000 letters from listeners in Pakistan, over 3,500 from India, and nearly 500 from other countries.

On October 9, 2011, more than 80 people from all over the country attended the 11th listeners' conference of Radio Veritas Asia's Urdu language service in Lahore. RVA's Urdu service airs 13 morning and evening programs reaching listeners in Pakistan and India. In 2011 Father Nadeem John Shakir was the studio director.

The 15th Conference of Catholic radio listeners was held on 21 September 2015 at Loyola Hall in Lahore. It was attended by 120 people from around the country. Bishop Joseph Arshad of Faisalabad and head of the Commission for Social Communications, addressed the conference invited the participants to build peace, tolerance and brotherhood in society via the radio.

Funding
The service is largely funded by the German donors Missio. In 2010 they announced a cut back of 10 percent of their annual funding. The center received until 2005 annual funding of 10,000 rupees from the Catholic Bishops' Conference of Pakistan for their Urdu service.

RVA programs
RVA programming evolves from its two-fold objectives.

Evangelization
It has a mix of moral, religious, evangelical and sociocultural, and entertainment programs on offer, as well as a few political, economic and informational programs. Programs include:
Gospel Reflection 
Church News 
Morals 
Catholic Doctrines 
Catechesis
Liturgy and Sacraments 
Dialogue with Religions and Cultures 
Role of the Church in the Modern World

Human development
In 2015, it offers two 27 minute programs, one in the morning and one at night, dealing with health, culture, values, famous places in the world, personalities, social issues, literature, inventions and world news.

People Empowerment 
Community Building  
Family  
Women and Youth  
Science and Technology 
Environment 
History and Culture 
News and Information 
Health

Through the years

RVA and the Pope
During the 25th anniversary celebration of RVA in 1995 Pope John Paul II said that RVA must be helped to fulfill its mission even though this will certainly involve even greater sacrifices and renewed commitment on the part of the local churches in Asia.

Pope Francis sent a message to the station, which celebrated its 50th anniversary on April 11, 2019, calling for it to help build “a more just and united society".

The library
The broadcast tapes of the 1986 People Power Revolution are housed in the RVA archives. UNESCO has catalogued the audio files as part of the selected collection included in the Memory of the World Program and Digital Preservation of Documentary Heritage.

News
On 25 July 2020, the chair of the National Commission for Social Communications, Archbishop Joseph Arshad of Islamabad-Rawalpindi launched the Radio Veritas Asia Urdu news service. This is the first Catholic news program of its kind in the country.

See also
Catholic Media Network 
DZRV

References

Website
Radio Veritas Asia's website

International broadcasters
1969 establishments in the Philippines
Radio stations in the Philippines
Mass media companies of the Philippines
Philippine radio networks
Catholic radio stations
Companies based in Quezon City
Catholic Church in Pakistan
Mass media in Pakistan
Urdu-language mass media
Radio stations established in 1969
Mass media in Lahore
Privately held companies